Marc Bécam (9 October 1931 – 21 April 2021) was a French politician. A member of the Rally for the Republic, he was best known as Mayor of Quimper.

Biography
The son of an engineer, Bécam studied agricultural engineering and began his career with the Fédération nationale des syndicats d'exploitants agricoles in Brittany, where he worked when Breton farmers revolted and took over Morlaix in 1961.

Bécam entered politics in the late 1960s, when he was elected to the National Assembly to represent Finistère's 1st constituency. He also served as Mayor of Quimper and was a Senator for Finistère from 1980 to 1986. A Gaullist, he was close to the Union of Democrats for the Republic before joining the Rally for the Republic. He then became an independent politician. He had favorable views on abortion and was anti-death penalty, as seen in his votes for the Veil Act and for abolition of capital punishment.

Marc Bécam died in Quimper on 21 April 2021 at the age of 89.

References

1931 births
2021 deaths
Rally for the Republic politicians
Deputies of the 4th National Assembly of the French Fifth Republic
Deputies of the 5th National Assembly of the French Fifth Republic
French Senators of the Fifth Republic
Senators of Finistère
Departmental councillors (France)
Mayors of places in Brittany
People from Finistère